Homer C. Folks (February 18, 1867 – February 14, 1963) was a United States sociologist who worked as a social welfare advocate. He was the New York City Commissioner of Public Charities.

Biography
Folks was born in Hanover, Michigan, on February 18, 1867, to James Folks. He attended Albion College in Michigan then Harvard University, where he graduated in 1890.

From 1890 to 1893 he was secretary of the Children's Aid Society of Pennsylvania, and from 1893 to 1902 secretary of the New York State Charities Aid Association. He was elected to the New York City Board of Aldermen as an anti Tammany member in 1897 and 1898, and was an unsuccessful candidate for the New York State Assembly in 1899. In the spring of 1900 he went to Cuba to assist the United States military authorities in reorganizing the public charities of the island. In 1901 he became secretary of the National Conference of Charities and Correction, and in January 1902, was appointed by Mayor Seth Low as Commissioner of Public Charities for New York City. His literary work includes the editing of the Charities Review, and the publication of numerous reports and magazine articles, a book entitled The Care of Destitute, Neglected, and Delinquent Children (1902), and another book, The Human Costs of The War (1920).  Homer Folks Hospital, located in Oneonta, New York, named in his honor, opened December 18, 1935, and served as a tuberculosis hospital for almost 38 years.

He died on February 14, 1963, in The Bronx at age 95.

See also
 List of recipients of the Silver Buffalo Award

References

External links

Biography at Answers.com

1867 births
1963 deaths
American sociologists
American child activists
Harvard University alumni
Albion College alumni
Commissioners of Public Charities
People from Hanover, Michigan